Lady Tweedsmuir may refer to:

Priscilla Buchan, Baroness Tweedsmuir of Belhelvie - (1915 – 1978) - British Unionist and Conservative politician 
Susan Buchan, Baroness Tweedsmuir - (1882 – 1977) -  British writer and the wife of author John Buchan